Swagger is an American sports drama television series created by Reggie Rock Bythewood. Loosely inspired by the experiences of current NBA player Kevin Durant, the series premiered on October 29, 2021 on Apple TV+. In June 2022, the series was renewed for a second season.

Swagger has garnered critical acclaim from critics for its writing, acting (primarily Jackson's and Hill's), production values and social commentary.

Premise
Swagger explores the world of youth basketball, and the players, their families and coaches who walk the fine line between dreams and ambition, and opportunism and corruption.

Cast

Main
 O'Shea Jackson Jr. as Ike Edwards
 Isaiah Hill as Jace Carson
 Shinelle Azoroh as Jenna Carson
 Tessa Ferrer as Meg Bailey
 Quvenzhané Wallis as Crystal Jarrett
 Caleel Harris as Musa Rahim
 James Bingham as Drew Murphy
 Solomon Irama as Phil Marksby
 Ozie Nzeribe as Royale Hughes
 Jason Rivera-Torres as Nick Mendez
 Tristan Wilds as Alonzo Powers

Recurring
 Christina Jackson as Tonya Edwards, Ike's wife.
 Marc Blucas as Coach Bobby, a rival team coach.
 Sean Baker as Naim Rahim, Swagger's deputy coach and Musa's father.
 Jordan Rice as Jackie Carson, Jenna's daughter and Jace's older sister.
 Al Mitchell as Coach Warrick, Crystal's basketball coach who abuses his players.
 Javen Lewis as Vince Charles, a Swagger player. 
 Tracey Bonner as Angie Jarrett, Crystal's mother.
 Marti O. Pruitt as Jeremiah Jarrett, Crystal's father.
 Miles Mussenden as Brett Hughes, Royale's father and a financial backer of Swagger.
 Misha Gonz-Cirkl as Teresa Mendez, Nick's mother
 Avery Serell Wills Jr. as Ricky, a Swagger player.
 Nadej K. Bailey as Tamika, Musa's love interest
 Kurt Lamarr as Coach Charlie Edwards, Ike's father
 Arischa Conner as Apocalypse Anne
 Katie Killacky as Eva Murphy, Drew's mother

Guest
 Andrew C. Williams as Kai
 Robert Crayton as Barber Marvin
 Jared Wofford as Harold Phillips
 Gwen L. Johnson as Cynthia
 Brian K. Landis as Warren Murphy

Episodes

Production

Development
Apple began developing the project in February 2018, and it was ordered in December 2018 as a sports drama television series titled Nig/ger from Kevin Durant and Reggie Rock Bythewood. Bythewood will be the showrunner, writer, director, and executive producer with Durant, Brian Grazer, Francie Calfo, Rich Kleiman, and Samantha Corbin Miller executive producing. On June 15, 2022, Apple renewed the series for a second season.

Casting
In October 2019, Deadline Hollywood reported that Winston Duke was cast as the lead, but in February 2020, Duke suffered an injury on set and was replaced with O’Shea Jackson Jr. On July 9, 2020, Quvenzhané Wallis joined the series in the role of Crystal, and on January 15, 2021, Isaiah Hill, Shinelle Azoroh, Tristan Mack Wilds, Caleel Harris, Tessa Ferrer, Jason Rivera, Solomon Irama, Ozie Nzeribe, and James Bingham were all revealed to have been cast. On August 11, 2022, Orlando Jones and Shannon Brown joined the cast as series regulars, while Christina Jackson and Sean Baker were promoted to series regulars for the second season.

Filming
Alongside the casting of Winston Duke, Deadline Hollywood reported that filming would occur in October 2019. After Duke’s injury in February 2020, filming was delayed due to recasting, and was then delayed even further due to the COVID-19 pandemic. By December 2020, filming restarted in Richmond, Virginia, with filming also taking place in Hopewell, Virginia in March 2021. In April 2021, filming wrapped for the series.

References

External links
 

2020s American black television series
2020s American drama television series
2021 American television series debuts
English-language television shows
Apple TV+ original programming
American sports television series
Basketball television series
Television series by CBS Studios
Television series by Imagine Entertainment
Television shows filmed in Virginia